Johann Friedrich Pfaff (sometimes spelled Friederich; 22 December 1765 – 21 April 1825) was a German mathematician. He was described as one of Germany's most eminent mathematicians during the 19th century. He was a precursor of the German school of mathematical thinking, which under Carl Friedrich Gauss and his followers largely determined the lines on which mathematics developed during the 19th century.

Biography
He received his early education at the Carlsschule, where he met Friedrich Schiller, his lifelong friend. His mathematical capacity was noticed during his early years. He pursued his studies at Göttingen under Abraham Gotthelf Kästner, and in 1787 he went to Berlin and studied practical astronomy under J. E. Bode. In 1788, Pfaff became professor of mathematics in Helmstedt, and continued his work as a professor until that university was abolished in 1810. After this event, he became professor of mathematics at the University of Halle, where he stayed for the rest of his life.

He studied mathematical series and integral calculus, and is noted for his work on partial differential equations of the first order Pfaffian systems, as they are now called, which became part of the theory of differential forms; and as Carl Friedrich Gauss's formal research supervisor. He knew Gauss well, when they both lived together in Helmstedt in 1798. August Möbius was later his student.

His two principal works are Disquisitiones analyticae maxime ad calculum integralem et doctrinam serierum pertinentes (4to., vol. i., Helmstädt, 1797) and “Methodus generalis, aequationes differentiarum particularum, necnon aequationes differentiales vulgares, utrasque primi ordinis inter quotcumque variabiles, complete integrandi” in Abhandlungen der Königlichen Akademie der Wissenschaften zu Berlin (1814-1815).

His brother Johann Wilhelm Andreas Pfaff was a professor of pure and applied mathematics. Another brother, Christoph Heinrich Pfaff, was a professor of medicine, physics and chemistry.

Works

See also
 Pfaffian

Notes

References

External links

1765 births
1825 deaths
18th-century German mathematicians
19th-century German mathematicians
Members of the Prussian Academy of Sciences
Members of the French Academy of Sciences
Mathematical analysts
Linear algebraists
People educated at the Karlsschule Stuttgart
People from the Duchy of Württemberg
PDE theorists
University of Göttingen alumni
Academic staff of the University of Helmstedt
Academic staff of the Martin Luther University of Halle-Wittenberg
Scientists from Stuttgart